The following is the list of songs recorded by singer Kavita Krishnamurthy in South-Indian languages such as Kannada, Tamil, Telugu and Malayalam.

Kannada songs
Kavita started her singing career from the Kannada film industry. Kavita made her Kannada debut through the film "Ondanondu Kaladalli" in 1978. She also created an impact in the mind of audiences in Karnataka with her soul-stirring voice, which she has rendered in many blockbuster films like H2O, Deadly Soma and Raja Huli. She has worked with notable composers like Gurukiran, Sadhu Kokila, Rajesh Ramanath and Hamsalekha.

Film songs

Non-film Kannada songs
Kavita has recorded Purandara Dasa's classical Kannada songs in Karnataka Sangeetha style.

Tamil songs
Film songs
Kavita made her Tamil debut through the film "Ulagam Pirandhadhu Enakkaga" in the year 1990.

Serial songs

Telugu songs
She often worked with Mani Sharma and has rendered her voice to actresses like Aishwarya Rai, Simran Bagga and Trisha Krishnan.

Malayalam songs

Bengali songs

References

http://www.oosai.com/singer_list.cfm?sngrnm=Kavitha%20Krishnamurthy
http://www.tamilmusica.org/Singer/Kavitha%20Krishnamurthy/

External links
 Kavita Krishnamurthy - IMDb
 Kavita Krishnamurthy Biography, Career Details

Lists of songs recorded by Indian singers